Jean-Joseph de Mondonville (25 December 1711 (baptised) – 8 October 1772), also known as Jean-Joseph Cassanéa de Mondonville, was a French violinist and composer. He was a younger contemporary of Jean-Philippe Rameau and enjoyed great success in his day. Pierre-Louis Daquin (son of the composer Louis-Claude Daquin) claimed, "If I couldn't be Rameau, there's no one I would rather be than Mondonville".

Life

Mondonville was born in Narbonne in Occitania (South France) to an aristocratic family which had fallen on hard times. In 1733, he moved to Paris where he gained the patronage of the king's mistress Madame de Pompadour and won several musical posts, including violinist for the Concert Spirituel.

His first opus was a volume of violin sonatas, published in 1733. He became a violinist of the Chapelle royale and chamber and performed in some 100 concerts. Some of his grands motets were also performed that year, receiving considerable acclaim. He was appointed sous-maître in 1740 and, in 1744, intendant of the Chapelle royale. He produced operas and grands motets for the Opéra and Concert Spirituel respectively, and was associated with the Théatre des Petits-Cabinets, all the while maintaining his career as a violinist throughout the 1740s. In 1755, he became director of the Concert Spirituel on the death of Pancrace Royer. Mondonville died in Belleville near Paris at the age of sixty.

Music

Sacred music
Between 1734 and 1755, Mondonville composed 17 grands motets, of which only nine have survived. The motet Venite exultemus domino, published in 1740, won him the post of Maître de musique de la Chapelle (Master of Music of the Chapel). Thanks to his mastery of both orchestral and vocal music, Mondonville brought to the grand motet — the dominant genre of music in the repertory of the Chapelle royale (Royal Chapel) before the French Revolution — an intensity of colour and a dramatic quality hitherto unknown. In 1758, he introduced oratorios as a new genre at the Concert Spirituel.

Operas
Although Mondonville's first stage work, Isbé, was a failure, he enjoyed great success with the lighter forms of French Baroque opera: the opéra-ballet and the pastorale héroïque. His most popular works were Le carnaval de Parnasse, Titon et l'Aurore and Daphnis et Alcimadure (for which he wrote his own libretto in Languedocien, his native dialect of the Occitan language). Titon et l'Aurore played an important role in the Querelle des Bouffons, the controversy between partisans of French and Italian opera which raged in Paris in the early 1750s. Members of the "French party" ensured that Titon'''s premiere was a resounding success (their opponents even alleged they had guaranteed this result by packing the Académie Royale de Musique, where the staging took place, with royal soldiers). Mondonville's one foray into serious French opera - the genre known as tragédie en musique - was a failure however. He took the unusual step of re-using a libretto, Thésée, which had originally been set in 1675 by the "father of French opera", Jean-Baptiste Lully. Mondonville's bold move to substitute Lully's much-loved music with his own did not pay off. The premiere at the court in 1765 had a mixed reception and a public performance two years later ended with the audience demanding it be replaced by the original. Yet Mondonville was merely ahead of his time - in the 1770s, it became fashionable to reset Lully's tragedies with new music, the most famous example being Armide by Gluck.

Selected works
Instrumental
 Sonates pour violon op.1 (1733)
 (6) Sonates en trio pour deux Violons avec la basse continue Œuvre Second, Dédiées à Monsieur le Marquis de la Bourdonnaye, gravées par Le Duc, Paris 1734 6 Pièces de clavecin en sonates op.3 (1734, orchestrated as Sonates en symphonies 1749) 
 The preface of op.4 contains the first evidence of a written text concerning playing with harmonic sounds, "Les sons harmoniques" (Paris and Lille, 1738)
 Pièces de clavecin avec voix ou violon op.5 (1748)

Operas
 Isbé (1742)
 Bacchus et Erigone (1747)
 Le carnaval du Parnasse (1749)
 Vénus et Adonis (1752)
 Titon et l'Aurore (1753)
 Daphnis et Alcimadure (1754)
 Les fêtes de Paphos (1758)
 Thésée (1765)
 Les projets de l'Amour (1771)

Grands motets
Mondonville's nine surviving grands motets are:
 Dominus regnavit decorem (Psalm 92) (1734)
 Jubilate Deo (Psalm 100) (1734)
 Magnus Dominus (Psalm 48) (1734)
 Cantate domino (Psalm 150) (1743)
 Venite exultemus Domino (Psalm 95) (1743)
 Nisi Dominus aedficavit (Psalm 127) (1743)
 De profundis (Psalm 130) (1748)
 Coeli enarrant gloria (Psalm 19) (1750)
 In exitu Israel (Psalm 115) (1753)

Oratorios
Mondonville's three oratorios (none survive) were:
 Les Israélites à la Montagne d'Oreb (1758)
 Les Fureurs de Saul (1759)
 Les Titans (1761)

Recordings of works by Mondonville
 Pieces de clavecin avec voix ou violon Op.5 Judith Nelson, William Christie, Stanley Ritchie (Harmonia Mundi, 1980)
 Titon et l'Aurore Les Musiciens du Louvre, Marc Minkowski (Erato, 1992)
 Les fêtes de Paphos Les Talens Lyriques, Christophe Rousset (Decca L'Oiseau-Lyre, 1997)
 Les Grands Motets (Dominus regnavit, In exitu Israel, De profundis) Les Arts Florissants, William Christie (Erato, 1997)
 Six sonates 'en symphonies' Op. 3 Les Musiciens du Louvre, Marc Minkowski (Deutsche Grammophon, 1998)
 Venite Exultemus, De Profundis (Grands Motets) Oxford New College Choir, [Edward Higginbottom] (Helios, 1999)
 The aria "Désirs toujours détruits" from Isbé, sung by Véronique Gens on the collection Tragédiennes (Virgin Classics, 2006)
 Trio Sonatas Op. 2 Ensemble Diderot, Johannes Pramsohler (Audax Records, 2016)
 French Sonatas for Harpsichord and Violin Philippe Grisvard, Johannes Pramsohler (Audax Records, 2018)

References

Sources
 Brief biographical entry in the Grove Concise Dictionary of Music, 1994, published by Oxford University Press, Inc. on  the Gramophone website.
Booklets to the above recordings
 The Viking Opera Guide ed. Amanda Holden (Viking, 1993)
 C. Pierre, Histoire du Concert spirituel (Paris: Société française de musicologie, 1975).
 R. Machard, Jean-Joseph Cassanea de Mondonville: Virtuose, compositeur et Chef d'orchestre'' (Béziers: Société de Musicologie du Languedoc, 1980).

External links

 

1711 births
1772 deaths
18th-century classical composers
18th-century French composers
18th-century French male classical violinists
French Baroque composers
French male classical composers
French opera composers
French ballet composers
Male opera composers
Occitan-language writers
People from Narbonne
17th-century male musicians